Fribourg is a Belgian surname. Notable people with the surname include:

Michel Fribourg (1913–2001), Belgian-born American billionaire
Paul J. Fribourg (born 1954/55), American businessman, chairman, and CEO of ContiGroup Companies

Surnames of Belgian origin